Charlie Turner (born December 12, 1944) is a former offensive lineman who played twelve seasons the Canadian Football League. He won two Grey Cups for the Edmonton Eskimos and another one with the Hamilton Tiger-Cats. He won the CFL's Most Outstanding Offensive Lineman Award in 1975.

References

1944 births
Living people
American players of Canadian football
Canadian football offensive linemen
Edmonton Elks players
Hamilton Tiger-Cats players
Ohio Bobcats football players
Winnipeg Blue Bombers players